Attractions in Shanghai, China, include:

The Bund
Bund Sightseeing Tunnel
City God Temple 
Consulate-General of Russia in Shanghai
Expo 2010
General Post Office Building
Happy Valley Shanghai
Jade Buddha Temple
Jin Mao Tower 
Jing'an Temple
Jinjiang Action Park
Longhua Temple
Nanjing Road
Oriental Pearl Tower
People's Park
People's Square
Pudong
Qibao
St. Ignatius Cathedral of Shanghai
Shanghai French Concession 
Shanghai Grand Theatre 
Shanghai International Circuit 
Shanghai Ocean Aquarium 
Shanghai Oriental Arts Center
Shanghai Urban Planning Exhibition Center 
Shanghai Zoo 
She Shan Basilica
Taikang Lu
Thames Town
Wen Miao
Xintiandi
Yuyuan Garden 
Yuyuan Tourist Mart
Tianzifang

Museums

C. Y. Tung Maritime Museum
China Art Museum
Museum of Contemporary Art Shanghai
Shanghai Art Museum
Shanghai Auto Museum
Shanghai Museum
Shanghai Natural History Museum
Shanghai Science and Technology Museum
Song Ching Ling Memorial Residence in Shanghai
Shanghai Jewish Refugees Museum
Shanghai Metro Museum

Parks and gardens

Century Park
Changfeng Park
Dongping National Forest Park
Guyi Garden (Jiading)
Huangpu Park
Lu Xun Park
Oriental Land (Qingpu)
People's Park
People's Square
Yuyuan Garden
Zhongshan Park

References

Attractions
Culture in Shanghai
Shanghai
Shanghai
Shanghai-related lists
Tourism in Shanghai